Flor de Fuego is the fourth studio album from the Venezuelan Latin rock band Caramelos de Cianuro.

Members
 Asier Cazalís (Vocalist)
 Alfonso Tosta (Drummer)
 Pável Tello (Bassist)
 Miguel González "El Enano" (Guitarist)

Track listing
 Como Serpiente
 No Eres Tú
 Baby Cohete
 Delineador 
 Chewin Gum
 Así
 Guerra Lenta
 Flor de Fuego
 Electrobotic
 Veneno

2006 albums
Rock en Español albums
Caramelos de Cianuro albums